A class action waiver is a provision found in some contracts which prohibits a party from filing a class action legal proceeding against the other party, or both parties waiving the right to file class actions against each other. These clauses are most often found in the United States and agreements with American citizens.

Class action waivers may be found on a standalone basis, though they are more commonly found as part of an arbitration clause, and when paired with such clauses, frequently include jury trial waivers. All three clauses are the subject to controversy and wide legal debate, with supporters claiming the tools are strong risk management tools and the expense that class action litigation presents both in regard to time and money, though advocacy groups argue that these clauses reduce the rights of consumers and employees and prevent companies from being held accountable for grievances such as wage and hour violations. Class action waivers legality across countries and administrative decisions range in legality between jurisdictions, with some countries and provinces like France and Canadian province of Ontario banning such clauses, while the United States Supreme Court ruling in Epic Systems Corp. v. Lewis that such clauses are enforceable.

Contractual language 
Most class action waiver clauses include this wording or a variation of it:

Legal status by country 
Many countries have not tested a class action waiver in courts, though the international law firm CMS predicts that these clauses are unconscionable or unenforceable in Germany, Italy, Russia, and in England and Wales.

Australia 
Class action waivers remained untested in Australia until December 2021, where the Federal Court of Australia found it was an unfair contract term. In Karpik v Carnival plc, the court found that Australian Consumer Laws in section 23 (which already bans standard form contracts) prohibits class action waivers.

Canada 
Class action waivers lack a uniform policy across Canada, as the Supreme Court of Canada has found that provincial legislation governs disputes. Nationally, though, in Seidel v. TELUS Communications, the court found that because a class action waiver was attached to an invalid arbitration agreement, the class action waiver was void.

On the provincial level, Ontario, per the Consumer Protection Act of 2002, has banned class action waivers. A court of appeals in British Columbia also found that class action waivers were unenforceable and unconscionable in Pearce v. 4 Pillars Consulting Group due to the contract in question being a standard form contract written by 4 Pillars and giving little bargaining power to Pearce.

France 
Under Article L. 623-32 of the French Consumer Code, as well as Article L. 1143-21 of the French Public Health Code, France considers class action waivers "abusive" and illegal within the country.

India 
Class action waivers have not been tested in Indian courts, though Order 1 Rule 8 of the Code of Civil Procedure allows for consumers, with court permission, to initiate class action lawsuits, which the Indian law firm Shardul Amarchand Mangaldas & Co notes can be problematic for the enforceability of class action waivers.

United States 
The Supreme Court of the United States has found on multiple occasions that class action waivers are legal. In AT&T Mobility LLC v. Concepcion, the high court ruled that class action waivers are legal under the Federal Arbitration Act as they significantly impact what the court saw as Congress's pro-arbitration stance on arbitration. The court reiterated its stance in Epic Systems Corp. v. Lewis. In Epic, Justice Neil Gorsuch authored a majority opinion which outlined that the US Congress, upon legislating the National Labor Relations Act of 1935, likely did not wish "to confer a right to class or collective actions in [Section 7 of the NLRA], since those procedures were hardly known when the NLRA was adopted in 1935". Justice Clarence Thomas concurred in a separate opinion, writing that the illegality of the class action waiver is a public policy defense, referring to McMullen v. Hoffman.

Class action waivers, however, are not enforceable in cases of sexual assault or sexual harassment; the 117th Congress passed and President Joe Biden signed the Ending Forced Arbitration of Sexual Assault and Sexual Harassment Act in 2022 which additionally prohibited the enforcement of class action waivers. Prior to Epic and AT&T,  New York and California have attempted to ban class action waivers, and in the case of California, use such laws to additionally invalidate arbitration agreements or allow judges to refuse to enforce class action waivers in certain circumstances. National lawmakers have also pushed to pass the proposed Forced Arbitration Injustice Repeal Act, which would ban the enforcement of both arbitration clauses and class action waivers in many cases today seen by some as unfair or anti-consumer.

See also 

 Arbitration clause
 Forced Arbitration Injustice Repeal Act

References 

Contract law legal terminology
Contract law
Class action lawsuits